Trapz of Poetic Poison is the first release by the Canadian Hip-Hop/Rap band Project Wyze. It contains six tracks. It was recorded over a three-day recording session at Metalworks Studios in Toronto, Ontario. It was released independently. This would be the only release until their next EP came out in 1999, Only If I Knew.

Track listing

Project Wyze albums
1996 albums